The Maritime Border Command (MBC) is  Australia's  principal civil maritime security agency, a de facto coast guard, operating in the maritime domain to ensure compliance with Australia's maritime legislation by foreign and domestic non-state actors. It is responsible for border protection in the exclusive economic zone of Australia and its 19,650 kilometres of coastline and issues such as illegal fishing and exploitation of natural resources, maritime terrorism and piracy, biosecurity threats, and marine pollution. 

It is a multi-agency command within the Department of Home Affairs comprising both Australian Border Force (ABF) and Australian Defence Force (ADF) personnel, led by a rear admiral in the Royal Australian Navy. In February 2019, Lee Goddard was promoted to the rank of rear admiral and became the Commander of MBC.

The command was established in 2005 and originally named the Joint Offshore Protection Command. In October 2006 it was renamed to Border Protection Command and was again retitled to its current name in July 2015 to coincide with the establishment of ABF.

Structure
The MBC is a joint unit of the Australian Defence Force (the Royal Australian Navy Patrol Force and the Royal Australian Air Force Surveillance and Response Group) and the Australian Border Force (Marine Unit and Coastwatch aircraft). Its headquarters are in Canberra and is part of the Operations Group of the ABF. The ABF is part of the Australian Department of Home Affairs. Since September 2013, the MBC has supported the Operation Sovereign Borders Joint Agency Taskforce.

The ADF elements of MBC are commanded from Northern Command in Darwin, Northern Territory.

The Australian Federal Police supports the MBC and particularly the ABF with criminal investigations, law enforcement and national security matters.

Role
The MBC delivers a coordinated national approach to offshore protection by operating as a single maritime surveillance, response and interception agency.

It detects and deters a wide range of illegal activities using a combination of ABF and ADF aircraft and vessels. ABF response assets include Coastwatch aircraft and Marine Unit patrol vessels. Its activities take place under a variety of legislation covering areas such as customs, fisheries, quarantine, immigration, environment and law enforcement.

The MBC is responsible for coordinating and controlling operations to protect Australia's national interests against the following maritime security threats:
 illegal exploitation of natural resources
 illegal activity in protected areas
 unauthorised maritime arrivals
 prohibited imports/exports
 maritime terrorism
 piracy
 compromise to bio-security
 marine pollution.

Commanders

References

External links
 Border Protection Command
 Rear Admiral Russ Crane Increasing our offshore maritime security

Commonwealth Government agencies of Australia
Federal law enforcement agencies of Australia
Commands of the Australian Defence Force
Borders of Australia